The Kater Rocks are a small cluster of rocks lying  northwest of Cape Kater, Graham Land, Antarctica. The rocks were first charted and named by the Swedish Antarctic Expedition, 1901–04, under Otto Nordenskjold.

References

External links

Rock formations of Graham Land
Davis Coast